Red Wing Shoes (Red Wing Shoe Company, LLC) is an American footwear company based in Red Wing, Minnesota that was founded by Charles H. Beckman in 1905.

Within 10 years of its inception, Red Wing Shoes was producing more than 200,000 pairs of boots per year and was the primary company manufacturing footwear for American soldiers fighting in World War I. Red Wing Shoes continued its tradition of producing footwear for wartime use by manufacturing boots for American soldiers during World War II.

Products
Though Red Wing Shoes is known primarily for their leather boots intended for heavy work, in recent years the company has expanded its line-up to include athletic-styled work shoes and footwear designed for specific job applications (such as slip-resistant shoes designed for the service industry and boots ideal for the mining industry that utilize a metatarsal guard). The company produces Oxfords, chukkas, hiking boots, and logger styles, as well as 6-inch and 8-inch work boots. While the core of Red Wing's focus is on work boots, in 2008 Red Wing Shoes added a Heritage catalog and also has experimented with more fashion-oriented shoes.

Manufacturing

The Red Wing Shoe brand is primarily handmade in the USA with American materials at the company's plants in Red Wing, Minnesota; Potosi, Missouri, and Danville, Kentucky. As of 2014, there are six sources of manufacture: completely made in the USA, made in the USA with imported materials, assembled in the USA with imported components, made in China, made in Korea, and made in Vietnam.

In addition to manufacturing footwear under their own name, Red Wing Shoes also manufactures shoes under the Irish Setter Boots, Vasque, Carhartt (discontinued in 2011), and Worx brands. These other Red Wing brands include a majority of models manufactured in Vietnam and Cambodia. 
In order to comply with ASTM F 2413-11 and M I/75 C/75 standards for impact and compression, Red Wing Shoes manufactures many of their styles with steel, non-metallic, and aluminum safety toes and offers puncture-resistant options that meet the ASTM F 2413-11 standard. Red Wing Shoes also produces footwear that is static-dissipative in order to control the amount of electrical discharge from the body and electrical hazard in order to provide extra protection from accidental contact with electrically energized objects.

Safety issues
In 2013 Red Wing Shoes recalled over 114,000 pairs of steel toe boots due to defective toe caps that could fail to protect wearers' feet.

Heritage Shoes 
One of the most iconic shoes of all time is their Iron Ranger shoes.  Here are a list of their heritage line of shoes.

 Iron Ranger
Blacksmith
Classic Moc

See also 
 St. James Hotel (Red Wing, Minnesota): hotel owned by Red Wing Shoes

References

Marvy, Patrice Avon and Vrooman, Nicholas Curchin, Heart and Sole: A Story of the Red Wing Shoe Company, 1986
A Pictorial History of Red Wing Shoe Company's First 100 Years, Red Wing Republican Eagle Press, 2005

External links

Red Wing Shoes
Red Wing Heritage
Videos of Red Wing Shoes manufacturing (CC-BY)

Shoe companies of the United States
Clothing companies established in 1905
Companies based in Minnesota
Red Wing, Minnesota
1905 establishments in Minnesota